Justice League United or JLU, are a team of superheroes appearing in American  comic books published by DC Comics. The team was created by Jeff Lemire and Mike McKone. First appearing in their eponymous series, Justice League United #0 (published in April 2014 and cover-dated June 2014), the team features Animal Man, Equinox, Green Arrow, Martian Manhunter, Stargirl, Supergirl, Adam Strange and his partner Alanna Lewis. The team forms in the aftermath of "Forever Evil", following the disbandment of the United States Government-sanctioned Justice League of America.

Publication history
Justice League United began its development in the summer 2013 after "Forever Evil" was to be finished during its run at the time. Writer Jeff Lemire and artist Mike McKone were assigned in taking over Justice League of America, with the series being retitled Justice League Canada, as the series was to take place in Canada. Adam Strange and a brand new character of Canadian origin were expected to join the team.

Animal Man became a part of the team, when his eponymous solo title was canceled in December, which was also written by Lemire.

Justice League of America was instead relaunched in April 2014 as Justice League United with a zero-issue. The team's Canadian addition was revealed to be Miiyahbin Marten, a 16-year-old Cree teen from Moose Factory, with the codename Equinox. Her powers stem from the Earth and change with the seasons.

Jeff Parker took over as writer with issue 11 and DC canceled the series with issue 16 in December 2015, with news outlets citing low sales as the most likely cause of cancellation.

Team roster
 Adam Strange
 Alanna Strange
 Animal Man
 Batgirl (Barbara Gordon)
 Equinox
 Etrigan the Demon
 Green Arrow
 Hawkman (Katar Hol)
 Katana
 Martian Manhunter
 Mera
 Poison Ivy
 Robotman
 Sgt. Rock
 Stargirl
 Supergirl
 Swamp Thing (Alec Holland)
 Vandal Savage
 Vibe

Collected editions 

Justice League United Vol. 3: Reunited was solicited as collecting Justice League United #11-16 and DC Sneak Peek: Justice League United, however this was cancelled and never published.

References

2014 comics debuts
DC Comics titles
Justice League titles